I Am Belfast is a 2015 documentary film about Belfast, directed by Mark Cousins.

Reception
The film holds a 100% approval rating on Rotten Tomatoes based on 17 critical reviews.

References

External links
 

British documentary films
Films set in Belfast
Documentary films about cities
Works about Northern Ireland
Films directed by Mark Cousins
2015 films
Films scored by David Holmes (musician)
2010s British films